Global Supply Systems (GSS) was a British cargo airline based at London Stansted Airport. It provided dedicated freighters to airlines on a wet lease basis. The company held a United Kingdom Civil Aviation Authority Type A Operating Licence, it was permitted to carry passengers, cargo and mail on aircraft with 20 or more seats.

History 

The company changed its name to Global Supply Systems Limited on 31 January 2001, and started operations on 29 June 2002. It began flying operations for British Airways World Cargo between London Stansted, Frankfurt and Hong Kong using a Boeing 747-400 freighter on dry lease from partner Atlas Air. The company was founded by Atlas Air and John Robert Porter and was majority British-owned (51%), with Atlas Air as minority shareholder (49%).

In January 2014, British Airways World Cargo as the airline's main customer terminated its contract with Global Supply Systems, effective from 30 April. GSS was unable to find a new customer and ceased operations later that year.

The company continued to dry-lease two Boeing 777F aircraft to an international cargo airline.

Fleet 
Global Supply Systems had operated three Boeing 747-400F which were later replaced by three Boeing 747-8F.

See also
 List of defunct airlines of the United Kingdom

Notes

References

External links 

Official website

Defunct airlines of the United Kingdom
Airlines established in 2001
Defunct cargo airlines
Airlines disestablished in 2014